Chang Klang is a district (amphoe) of Nakhon Si Thammarat province, southern Thailand.

History
The district was created on 15 July 1996 by splitting the three southeastern tambons from Chawang district.

On 15 May 2007, all 81 minor districts were upgraded to full districts. On 24 August, the upgrade became official.

Geography
Neighboring districts are (from the north clockwise): Chawang, Lan Saka, Thung Song, and Na Bon.

Administration
The district is divided into three sub-districts (tambons), which are further subdivided into 35 villages (mubans). There are no municipal (thesaban) areas, and three tambon administrative organizations (TAO).

References

External links
amphoe.com

Districts of Nakhon Si Thammarat province